The following highways are numbered 755:

Costa Rica
 National Route 755

United States
  Interstate 755 (Mississippi) (proposed)
  Interstate 755 (Missouri) (former proposal)
  Louisiana Highway 755
  Maryland Route 755
  Missouri Route 755
  County Route 755 (Camden County, New Jersey)
  Farm to Market Road 755
  Virginia State Route 755

Territories
  Puerto Rico Highway 755